Fatemeh Ghasemi (born 14 February 2001) is an Iranian footballer, who plays as a forward for the Turkish Women's Super League club Ataşehir Belediyespor. She has been a member of the senior Iran women's national team.

Club career 
Ghasemi moved to Turkey and joined the Istanbul-based club Ataşehir Belediyespor to play in the Women's Super League.

International goals

References

External links

2001 births
Living people
Iranian women's footballers
Women's association football forwards
Ataşehir Belediyespor players
Turkish Women's Football Super League players
Iran women's international footballers
Iranian expatriate footballers
Iranian expatriate sportspeople in Turkey
Expatriate women's footballers in Turkey
21st-century Iranian women